Rebecca Davis may refer to:

 Rebecca Harding Davis (1831–1910), American author and journalist
 Rebecca Fjelland Davis (born 1956), American novelist and children's book author
 Rebecca Davis (voice actress), American voice actress in Iczer Girl Iczelion
 Rebecca Davis (Canadian actress) (born 1980), Canadian film and TV actress